Ournie is a rural community in the far south east part of the Riverina and situated about 15 kilometres north west from Welaregang and 20 kilometres south from Munderoo.  Ournie is situated on the banks of the Ournie Creek which flows into the Murray River and the area is only about 4 kilometres from the border of Victoria.

Ournie Post Office opened on 1 July 1872, closed in 1875, reopened in 1904 and closed again in 1968.

Notes and references

Towns in the Riverina
Towns in New South Wales